Kevin Lawrence Barnes (born May 30, 1974) is the singer, multi-instrumentalist, and songwriter for the indie rock group of Montreal, part of the Elephant 6 Collective. Barnes started the band and, although providing several stories as to the origin of the name, is said to have named it after a failed romance with a woman from Montreal. The group has recorded 18 full-length albums, and numerous EPs and 7" singles. Barnes' brother, David, is an artist and has designed most of the band's artwork for albums since the release of The Gay Parade.

of Montreal

of Montreal consists of various musicians, with Barnes being the only continuous member. The group has recorded 16 studio albums, beginning with Cherry Peel (1997), and, most recently, Freewave Lucifer f<ck f^ck f>ck, which was released on July 29, 2022 on Polyvinyl. While melodic pop has always been Barnes's primary vehicle, the band's style has transformed significantly since its debut. The acoustic tendencies of early albums gradually transformed into a more electronic, funk, and overall eclectic sound. One of the features which often appears in Barnes's songwriting is upbeat melodies with gloomy, cryptic lyrics and morose subject matter. At different periods in the band's career, Barnes has dealt with subjects both personal and fictional, tending to employ unusual words, phrases, and sophisticated wordplay.

Lyrical style

Barnes's writing has encompassed many styles over the years. Of Montreal's first album, Cherry Peel, dealt mainly with personal issues of unrequited love, as in the songs "Baby" or "Montreal"; or humorous mundane situations, as in "Tim I Wish You Were Born a Girl". Barnes's style then shifted to storytelling, often involving dialogues as in "Good Morning Mr. Edminton" (from the album Coquelicot Asleep in the Poppies: A Variety of Whimsical Verse), or fictional characters, such as Rose Robert or Jacques Lamure, and even a fictional mythological creature, the Efeblum.

The albums The Gay Parade, The Bedside Drama: A Petite Tragedy, and the aforementioned Coquelicot Asleep in the Poppies are constructed as concept albums.

By 2004, Barnes was starting to revert to more personal lyrics, even incorporating the names of familiars and using them as characters, including Barnes's daughter Alabee, in "So Begins Our Alabee" and "Miss Blonde Your Papa Is Failing", and Eva, an acquaintance and resident of Athens, Georgia, in "Bunny Ain't No Kind of Rider".

Barnes has fluctuated between writing personal and fictional lyrics, explaining:I think if you only write about yourself and your personal life it feels maybe a bit narcissistic, but I think it's inevitable that there will always be some aspect of your personal life or your personal emotions coming through, even if you write about something that would seem like fiction.Barnes's lyrics, though mostly concerned with dark themes, often portray a certain fondness for:

French literature, especially the works of Jean Genet, Guillaume Apollinaire or Georges Bataille
Avant-garde cinema, mentioning Luis Buñuel's Phantom of Liberty in "Lysergic Bliss", Jaromil Jireš' Valerie and Her Week of Wonders in "St. Exquisite Confessions", or Wong Kar-wai in "Rapture Rapes the Muses"
Greek mythology – "Heimdalsgate Like a Promethean Curse", "Rapture Rapes the Muses" (with references to "antediluvian Troy"), and frequent use of antonomasia (Petrarch and Dido in "So Begins Our Alabee", "Cato as a Pun")

Despite some lyrical references to drugs, Barnes does not use recreational drugs or psychedelics primarily for the purpose of aiding writing, composing, or recording.

On stage

With of Montreal, Barnes has always tried to cross the bridge between a love of theater, comedy, and music, often resulting in interludes between songs—skits, slow-motion sword fights and surreal interaction between band members. Barnes performs as many different alter egos or personas, once including a glam rock alter ego, Georgie Fruit, first mentioned in "The Past Is a Grotesque Animal." In 2007, Barnes described Georgie Fruit as a black man in his forties who has undergone multiple sex changes. In 2019, Barnes announced that the persona had been retired, tweeting that "it was an insensitive portrayal of a marginalized group of people that I had no [business] representing."

Barnes has performed in unusual circumstances, such as while astride a white horse, and while completely nude.

Other projects
A Pollinaire Rave is a comedy tour by Kevin Barnes, David Barnes, and Kevin Barnes's ex-wife, Nina. A CD with the same name was sold, and five of the seven songs on the EP became songs on the of Montreal album Satanic Panic in the Attic.
Barnes contributed to Bright Eyes' album Letting Off the Happiness, playing keyboard on "The Difference in the Shades" and performing the background vocals on "A Poetic Retelling of an Unfortunate Seduction".

Personal life 
In 2003, Barnes married Nina Aimee Grøttland, a graphic artist and former Ethnobabes member. They separated in December 2013. They have one daughter, Alabee, born in Oslo on December 29, 2004. As of 2020, Barnes's partner is Christina Schneider, the singer, guitarist, and songwriter for the pop group Locate S,1.

In 2020, Barnes "officially" came out as bisexual, non-binary, and genderqueer. Barnes' Twitter account lists she/her, he/him, and they/them pronouns.

References

1974 births
Living people
Place of birth missing (living people)
American alternative rock musicians
American rock guitarists
American male singer-songwriters
People from Cuyahoga County, Ohio
Of Montreal members
Alternative rock guitarists
Singer-songwriters from Ohio
Guitarists from Ohio
Musicians from Athens, Georgia
Polyvinyl Record Co. artists
Bar/None Records artists
21st-century American singers
Major Organ and the Adding Machine members
Bisexual singers
Non-binary singers
Bisexual songwriters
Non-binary songwriters
People with non-binary gender identities
American LGBT singers
American LGBT songwriters
LGBT people from Georgia (U.S. state)
Singer-songwriters from Georgia (U.S. state)
Bisexual non-binary people
American non-binary writers
American bisexual writers